September attacks may refer to:

The September 11 attacks in New York and Washington on September 11, 2001
The September 2006 Yemen attacks
The fictional nuclear attacks in the television series Jericho, situated in September 2006